The Toyota flowers comprise two different species of genetically engineered flower by the Japanese automaker Toyota. The flowers, derivatives of the gardenia and the cherry sage plant, respectively; have been developed for gardens of the Toyota Prius Tsutsumi, Japan plant.

The "Toyota" sage's leaves have unique attributes that absorb nitrogen oxides, while the gardenia's leaves create water vapour in the air to extract atmospheric heat. This in turn reduces the temperature of the areas surrounding the factory, thus reducing the carbon dioxide-emitting energy needed for cooling.

References 

Flowers
Flowers